The 2020 Turkey wildfires were a series of forest fires that broke out in several areas across Turkey throughout 2020. In the first ten months of the year, a total of  forestland was destroyed in 2,957 recorded wildfires. For comparison, the figures in the whole previous year were  forestland destroyed by 2,668 wildfires. , figures for 2020 fire starting have not yet been published by the General Directorate of Forestry.

Timeline

September
A wildfire , southbroke out at Gevenez of Yatağan district in Muğla Province, southwestern Turkey on 29 September. The fire destroyed  forest,  agricultural land, haylofts and some unused old houses.

October
A forest fire started at Sarımazı neighborhood of Belen district in Hatay Province, southern Turkey, on 9 October. Within two days, the fire burnt  of forest. The fire spread over to İskenderun and Arsuz districts affecting many residences, factories and nearly 100 people. According to an investigation, the fire was a result of arson masterminded by İzzettin İnan, alias "Seyfettin", and Suvar Derweş, Kurdish militants in Afrin Region, northwestern Syria.Two suspects were arrested as arsonists.

See also
2021 Turkish wildfires

References

Wildfires in Turkey
Arson in Turkey
Wildfires caused by arson
2020 wildfires
History of Muğla Province
History of Hatay Province
Firefighting in Turkey
September 2020 events in Turkey
October 2020 events in Turkey
2020 disasters in Turkey